were officials of the Tokugawa shogunate in Edo period Japan.

This bakufu title identifies an official with responsibility for surveying land.

List of jiwari-bugyō

 Tagame Morishige.

Notes

References
 Naito, Akira, Kazuo Hozumi, and H. Mack Horto. (2003).  Edo: the City that Became Tokyo. Tokyo: Kodansha.

See also
 Bugyō

Government of feudal Japan
Officials of the Tokugawa shogunate